Nikita Igorevich Kucherov (born 17 June 1993) is a Russian professional ice hockey right winger and alternate captain for the Tampa Bay Lightning of the National Hockey League (NHL). Regarded as one of the best players in the world, Kucherov won the Hart Memorial Trophy as the NHL's most valuable player, Art Ross Trophy as the league's leading scorer and the Ted Lindsay Award as the best player voted by fellow NHL players, for the 2018–19 season.

Kucherov won the Stanley Cup twice with the Lightning, in 2020 and 2021, leading the playoffs in scoring both times. Kucherov holds the record for most points by a Russian-born player in a single season (128), as well as the Lightning franchise playoff record for most points; goals and assists.

Playing career

Junior
Kucherov played for Krasnaya Armiya of the Russian Junior Hockey League, the junior team of CSKA Moscow starting in the 2009–10. He spent three seasons with the team, and made his professional debut in the Kontinental Hockey League (KHL) during this time, playing 27 KHL games over the 2010–11 and 2011–12 seasons. In the 2011 NHL Entry Draft, he was selected 58th overall by the Tampa Bay Lightning. In an attempt to transition to the North American style, Kucherov played major junior hockey with the Rouyn-Noranda Huskies of the Quebec Major Junior Hockey League (QMJHL). He signed a three-year entry level contract with the Lightning on 10 September 2012 while playing in the QMJHL.

Tampa Bay Lightning

Early years, "The Triplets" era (2013–2017)
Kucherov made his NHL debut on 25 November 2013 against the New York Rangers. He scored a goal on his first shot, on his first shift, against Henrik Lundqvist; he was the seventh player in Lightning history to score a goal in his NHL debut. On 28 October 2014, he recorded his first career hat trick against Mike Smith of the Arizona Coyotes.

During the 2014–15 season, Kucherov had a breakout season with the Tampa Bay Lightning. Playing on a line with Tyler Johnson and Ondrej Palat (later dubbed the "Triplets" line), Kucherov posted 29 goals, 36 assists, and 65 points. Kucherov also tied for the NHL lead in plus-minus with Max Pacioretty at a +38 rating. The +38 rating also set the Lightning single season franchise record for +/- rating. On 20 May 2015, Kucherov joined Martin St. Louis as the only players in Lightning history to record two game-winning goals in overtime in a single playoff year, having scored a winner that evening against the New York Rangers; he had scored one in Game 1 of the prior round against the Montreal Canadiens. Kucherov and the Triplets would prove to be one of the most dangerous lines in hockey during Tampa Bay's run to the 2015 Stanley Cup Finals, in which they would lose to the Chicago Blackhawks in six games. During the run, Kucherov scored 10 goals and 22 points.

On 11 October 2016, the Lightning re-signed Kucherov to a three-year, $14.3 million contract. In the previous season, Kucherov led the team in points (66) and was second in assists (36) and goals (30). Kucherov also set a career high in goals, points, power-play goals (9) and game-winning goals (4). He also ranked second on the team in shots (209) and power-play goals, while also leading the team with 19 multi-point games. He also skated in 17 Stanley Cup playoff games with the Lightning last season, scoring 11 goals and 19 points to go along with a +13 rating. He led the team during the playoffs in goals and points. He also finished second for goals and sixth for points in playoff scoring. On 10 January 2017, Kucherov was named to the 2017 NHL All-Star game as a member of the Atlantic Division team. On 21 February, Kucherov recorded his 200th career NHL point. On 27 February, Kucherov recorded his second career hat-trick, which was the 10th natural hat-trick in Lightning history. It was also the first ever in team history to have all three goals scored during the power plays. On 18 March, Kucherov recorded his 100th career NHL goal. On 23 March, Kucherov also recorded his second hat trick in less than a month apart from his first in the 2016–17 season. This also became his third hat trick in his NHL career. On 27 March, Kucherov had two assists, setting a Lightning record for most points in a single month with 22. On 7 April, Kucherov scored his 40th goal of the season, setting a new career high. With his 40th goal, Kucherov joined Steven Stamkos, Vincent Lecavalier, Martin St. Louis, and Brian Bradley as the only players in Lightning history with 40-goal seasons. Additionally, Kucherov joined Alexander Ovechkin, Evgeni Malkin, Ilya Kovalchuk, Pavel Bure, and Alexander Mogilny as the only Russian-born players with a 40-goal season at age 23 or younger. On 21 June, Kucherov was named a NHL second team All-Star for the 2016–17 season.

Rise to stardom, Hart Trophy and back-to-back Stanley Cup wins (2017–present)
On 12 October 2017, Kucherov also became the first player in franchise history to record a goal in five consecutive games to start a season. On 16 October, Kucherov recorded two more goals, which extended the streak to six games. In doing so, Kucherov joined Mario Lemieux, Keith Tkachuk, and Steve Yzerman as the only players in the last 30-years to score a goal in each of their first six games. On the very next night, Kucherov extended his goal scoring streak to seven games. In doing so, Kucherov became the sixth player in the modern era (since 1943−1944) to score in each of their team's first seven games. Kucherov's goal scoring streak was ended the following game. On 26 October, Kucherov recorded a point in his 11th consecutive game to start the season. In doing so, Kucherov tied Martin St. Louis for the longest season-opening point streak in Lightning history. Kucherov's streak was ended the following game. On 10 January 2018, Kucherov was named to the 2018 NHL All-Star Game, which was played at Amalie Arena in Tampa, Florida. On 8 February, Kucherov recorded a three-point night in a 5-2 Lightning victory over the visiting Vancouver Canucks. On 22 April, Kucherov recorded a goal in a 3–1 Lightning series clinching over the New Jersey Devils. The goal was his 10th point of the series, which established a new franchise record for most points in a single series.

On 10 July 2018, Kucherov signed an eight-year, $76 million contract extension with the Lightning. On 18 October, Kucherov recorded his 190th career NHL assist in a 3–1 Lightning victory over the visiting Detroit Red Wings. In December 2018, Kucherov set the franchise record for most assists (21) and points (30) in a single calendar month. On 2 January 2019, Kucherov was named to the 2019 National Hockey League All-Star Game. This was Kucherov's third consecutive selection to the All-Star Game. On 18 February, Kucherov recorded a 5-point night in a 5–1 Lightning win over the Columbus Blue Jackets at Nationwide Arena. Three of his five points came as assists, which gave Kucherov the Lightning single season record for assists (70), breaking the mark of 68, by Brad Richards and Martin St. Louis. On 9 March, Kucherov set the Lightning single season record for points in a season with his 109th point. The point came in a 3–2 Lightning win over the Detroit Red Wings at Amalie Arena. On 20 March, Kucherov recorded two power-play goals to give him the most power-play points by a Lightning player in a single season (47). Kucherov scored his 40th goal of the season on 5 April 2019 and recorded his 126th point, setting the record for most points in an NHL season during the salary cap era (since 2005), a record previously held by Joe Thornton. At the conclusion of the regular season, Kucherov had amassed 128 points (41 goals and 87 assists), surpassing Alexander Mogilny for most points in a season by a Russian-born player. Kucherov's 87 assists also tied Jaromir Jagr for the most assists in a single NHL season by a wing. Having amassed the most points for the regular season Kucherov was awarded the Art Ross Trophy. On 12 April, following the Lightning's game one loss in the first round of the playoffs against the Columbus Blue Jackets, Kucherov was suspended one game for boarding Markus Nutivaara during the team's game two loss. On 19 June, Kucherov was awarded the Hart Memorial Trophy, voted by hockey writers and the Ted Lindsay Award, voted by the players, as the most valuable player at the 2019 NHL Awards.

On 19 August 2020, Kucherov recorded three assists in a Lightning first round series clinching win over the Columbus Blue Jackets. The three assists moved Kucherov past Martin St. Louis for the most points (70) in Lightning playoff history. On 26 August, Kucherov recorded his first career 4-point playoff game in a 7–1 Lightning victory over the Boston Bruins in the third game of their second round series. On 8 September, Kucherov recorded a goal and 4 assists for a 5-point night in an 8–2 Lightning win over the New York Islanders in the first game of the Eastern Conference Final. Kucherov's 5-point game established a new franchise record for points in a single playoff game. Kucherov's 4 assists set a new franchise record for most assists in a single playoff season (16). Kucherov's goal in that game moved him past St. Louis for the most goals in Lightning playoff history (34). On 21 September, Kucherov recorded two assists in game 2 of the Stanley Cup Final. The two points moved Kucherov past Brad Richards for most points in a single playoff season in franchise history. That same day Kucherov was named as a Second Team All-Star for the 2019–20 season. Kucherov eventually won the Stanley Cup on 28 September 2020. He led the league in point (34) and assists (27) in the playoffs. Kucherov and Brayden Point also became the first teammates to have 30 playoff points (34 and 33 respectively) since Sidney Crosby and Evgeni Malkin (31 and 37 respectively) in 2009.

On 23 December 2020, it was announced that Kucherov would undergo hip surgery and would miss the entirety of the 2020–21 regular season. He returned for the playoffs, and led the league in playoff scoring with 32 points in 23 games as the Lightning repeated as Stanley Cup champions. Kucherov also led his team in playoff assists (24) and shots on goal (62). After Game 5 of the Stanley Cup Finals, in which the Lightning defeated the Montreal Canadiens to clinch the series 4–1, Kucherov appeared at the podium drunk and shirtless to answer reporters' questions, during which time he expressed his elation at the Lightning's defense of the Stanley Cup and praised the performance of the Lightning goaltender Andrei Vasilevskiy. During the conference, Kucherov also coined the term "number one bullshit" in reference to Vasilevskiy losing the Vezina Trophy as the league's top goaltender that season to Marc-André Fleury. At the ensuing Stanley Cup parade, Kucherov and several Lightning players wore shirts depicting Kucherov during his interview next to his famous "number one bullshit" quote.

International play

Kucherov played in several international tournaments with the Russian national junior team, including the 2012 and 2013 World Junior Championships, where Russia won a silver and then bronze medal.

In 2016 Kucherov made his debut for the Russian national team, joining Lightning teammates Nikita Nesterov, Vladislav Namestnikov, and Andrei Vasilevskiy at the 2016 World Cup of Hockey.

Kucherov, along with Vasilevskiy and Namestnikov played at the 2017 World Championship, where Russia won a bronze medal. He returned for the 2019 World Championship, again winning a bronze medal.

Personal life
Kucherov was born in Maykop in southern Russia, but moved with his family to Moscow at a young age. His mother took up a job at a hockey rink, which is how Kucherov first started to play.

Kucherov is married to Anastasiya, and has a son, Max, born in 2018.

Kucherov's father, Igor, is a Colonel in the Russian Army.

Career statistics

Regular season and playoffs
Bold indicates led league

International

Awards and honors

Records

NHL records
 Most assists in a single season by a wing in NHL history, 87 (2018–19) (Shares record with Jaromír Jágr)
 Most points in a single season by a Russian-born player, 128 (2018–19)

Tampa Bay Lightning records
 Most Playoff Points - 154 
 Most Playoff Goals - 52
 Most Playoff Assists - 102
 Most points in a single season, 128 (2018–19)
 Most assists in a single season, 87 (2018–19)
 Most points in a single playoff season, 34 (2019–20)
 Most assists in a single playoff season, 27 (2019–20)
 Most points in a single calendar month by a Tampa Bay Lightning player, 30 (2018–19)
 Most assists in a single calendar month by a Tampa Bay Lightning player, 21 (2018–19)
 Most consecutive games with a point to start a season by a Tampa Bay Lightning player, 11 (2017–18)
 Most consecutive games with a goal to start a season by a Tampa Bay Lightning player, 7 (2017–18)

Notes

References

External links
 

1993 births
Living people
Art Ross Trophy winners
Hart Memorial Trophy winners
HC CSKA Moscow players
Krasnaya Armiya (MHL) players
Lester B. Pearson Award winners
National Hockey League All-Stars
People from Maykop
Quebec Remparts players
Rouyn-Noranda Huskies players
Russian expatriate ice hockey people
Russian expatriate sportspeople in the United States
Russian ice hockey right wingers
Russian Orthodox Christians from Russia
Stanley Cup champions
Syracuse Crunch players
Tampa Bay Lightning draft picks
Tampa Bay Lightning players
Sportspeople from Adygea